Nagamangala is a PuraSabhe in Mandya district in the Indian state of Karnataka. The history of the town dates back to the period of Mahabharatha. Arjuna' son Babruvahana is said to have ruled this area, the town was earlier known by names Uluchi Nagara, Nagamandala.

List of temples in Nagamangala

Sri Yoganarasimha Temple
Saumyakeshava Temple
Sri Veerabhadreshwara & Bhadrakali Temple
Sri Anjenya temple, Kachenahalli
 Sri Muttinamma devi temple, Tuppadamadu
 Sri Malleshwara swamy temple, Tuppadamadu
 Sri Mulkattamma temple, Mulukatte
Sri Ranganatha temple, Vaddarahalli
sri Hucchamma devi temple
Sri Haddinakallu Hanumantharaya Swami temple
Sri Thirunarayana Temple, ThiruganaHalli
Sri Prasanna ganapati temple, T. B. Circle
Sri Varadarayaswamyi Temple, Dandigana Hallly

Demographics
 India census, Nagamangala had a population of 17776. Males constitute 50% of the population and females 50%. Nagamangala has an average literacy rate of 87.01%, higher than the state average of 75.36%: male literacy is 90.16%, and female literacy is 83.98%. In Nagamangala, 12% of the population is under 6 years of age.

References

External links

Mandya district

Cities and towns in Mandya district